McCrady is a surname. Notable people with the surname include:

Christine McCrady, Canadian curler
Edward McCrady (1802–1892), American politician
John McCrady (1911–1968), American painter and printmaker
Thurlo McCrady (1907–1999), American football, basketball, and track coach, athletics administrator and sports executive

See also
McCrady's Tavern and Long Room, tavern complex in Charleston, South Carolina